Bodzenta of Września or Jan Bodzanta (born 1290) was a Polish clergyman and bishop for the Roman Catholic Archdiocese of Kraków. He was appointed bishop in 1348. He died in 1366.

References

14th-century Roman Catholic bishops in Poland
1290 births
1366 deaths